Oregon Township may refer to:

Indiana
 Oregon Township, Clark County, Indiana
 Oregon Township, Starke County, Indiana

Iowa
 Oregon Township, Washington County, Iowa
 New Oregon Township, Howard County, Iowa

Michigan
 Oregon Township, Michigan

Ohio
 Oregon Township, Lucas County, Ohio

Pennsylvania
 Oregon Township, Wayne County, Pennsylvania

Township name disambiguation pages